Trimerotropis cyaneipennis is a species of band-winged grasshopper in the family Acrididae. It is found in North America. It is also known as the blue-winged grasshopper or blue crackler.

References

Oedipodinae
Articles created by Qbugbot
Insects described in 1889